Positive psychology is the scientific study of what makes life most worth living, focusing on both individual and societal well-being. It studies "positive subjective experience, positive individual traits, and positive institutions...it aims to improve quality of life." It is a field of study that has been growing steadily throughout the years as individuals and researchers look for common ground on better well-being.

Positive psychology began as a new domain of psychology in 1998 when Martin Seligman chose it as the theme for his term as president of the American Psychological Association. It is a reaction against past practices, which have tended to focus on mental illness and emphasized maladaptive behavior and negative thinking. It builds on the humanistic movement by Abraham Maslow, Rollo May, James Bugental, and Carl Rogers, which encourages an emphasis on happiness, well-being, and positivity, thus creating the foundation for what is now known as positive psychology.

Positive psychology focuses on eudaimonia, an Ancient Greek term for "the good life" and the concept for reflection on the factors that contribute the most to a well-lived and fulfilling life. Positive psychologists often use the terms subjective well-being and happiness interchangeably.

Positive psychologists have suggested a number of factors may contribute to happiness and subjective well-being. For example, social ties with a spouse, family, friends, colleagues, and wider networks; membership in clubs or social organizations; physical exercise; and the practice of meditation. Spirituality can also be considered a factor that leads to increased individual happiness and well-being. Spiritual practice and religious commitment is a topic researchers have been studying as another possible source for increased well-being and an added part of positive psychology.  Happiness may rise with increasing financial income, though it may plateau or even fall when no further gains are made or after a certain cut-off amount.

Definition and basic assumptions

Definition
Martin Seligman and Mihaly Csikszentmihalyi define positive psychology as "the scientific study of positive human functioning and flourishing on multiple levels that include the biological, personal, relational, institutional, cultural, and global dimensions of life."

Basic concepts
Positive psychology is concerned with eudaimonia, a Greek word meaning "good spirit". It is considered an essential element for the pursuit of happiness and a good life. It emphasizes cherishing that which holds the greatest value in life and other such factors that contribute the most to having a good life. While not attempting a strict definition of what makes up a good life, positive psychologists agree that one must be happy, engaged, and meaningful with their experiences. Martin Seligman referred to "the good life" as using your signature strengths every day to produce authentic happiness and abundant gratification.

Positive psychology complements, without intending to replace the traditional fields of psychology. Emphasizing the study of positive human development, could enhance our application and understanding in other fields. More specifically, those which are more clinical and scientific-based. Since they may produce a limited perspective and understanding. Positive psychology has also placed a significant emphasis on fostering positive self-esteem and self-image. Although positive psychologists, with a less humanist direction, focus less on such topics.

The basic premise of positive psychology is that human beings are often driven by the future more than the past. It also suggests that any combination of positive experiences/emotions, past or present, lead to a pleasant, happy life. Another aspect of this may come from our views outside of our own lives. The author of Grit, Angela Duckworth, might view this as having a prosocial purpose, which could have a positive psychological effect on our lives. Seligman identified other possible goals: families and schools that allow children to grow, workplaces that aim for satisfaction and high productivity, and teaching others about positive psychology. Psychologist Daniel Gilbert has also written extensively on the effects of time perception and happiness.

Those who practice positive psychology attempt psychological interventions that foster positive attitudes toward one's subjective experiences, individual traits, and life events. The goal is to minimize pathological thoughts that may arise in a hopeless mindset and to develop a sense of optimism toward life. Positive psychologists seek to encourage acceptance of one's past, excitement and optimism about one's future experiences, and a sense of contentment and well-being in the present.

Related concepts are happiness, well-being, quality of life, contentment, and meaningful life.

 Happiness: Has been sought after and discussed throughout time. Research has concluded that happiness can be thought of in the way we act and how we think in relative terms to it.
 Well-Being: Has often been referred to what is inherently good for an individual both physically and mentally, though other aspects could be added in to define well-being.
 Quality of life: Quality of life encompasses more than just physical and mental well-being; it can also include socioeconomic factors. However, there is a cultural difference with this term, as it can be perceived differently in different cultures and regions around the world. In the simplest of terms, this is how well you are living and functioning in life.

Research topics
According to Seligman and Peterson, positive psychology addresses three issues: positive emotions, positive individual traits, and positive institutions. Positive emotions are concerned with being content with one's past, being happy in the present and having hope for the future. Positive individual traits focus on one's strengths and virtues. Finally, positive institutions are based on strengths to better a community of people.

According to Peterson, positive psychologists are concerned with four topics: positive experiences, enduring psychological traits, positive relationships, and positive institutions. He also states that topics of interest to researchers in the field are states of pleasure or flow, values, strengths, virtues, talents, as well as the ways that these can be promoted by social systems and institutions.

History

Origin
While the formal discipline of positive psychology has only existed since 2000, the concepts that form the basis of it have been the subject of empirical study since at least the 1980s, and present in religious and philosophical discourse for thousands of years. It has been influenced by humanistic as well as psychodynamic approaches to treatment. Predating the use of the term “positive psychology”, researchers within the field of psychology had been focusing on topics that would now be included under this new denomination.

The term positive psychology dates back at least to 1954, when Maslow's first edition of Motivation and Personality was published with a final chapter titled "Toward a Positive Psychology." In the second edition published in 1970, he removed that chapter, saying in the preface that "a positive psychology is at least available today though not very widely." There have been indications that psychologists since the 1950s have been increasingly focused on the promotion of mental health rather than merely treating mental illness. From the beginning of psychology, the field has addressed the human experience using the "Disease Model," specifically studying and identifying the dysfunction of an individual.

Positive psychology grew as an important field of study within psychology in 1998 when Martin Seligman chose it as the theme for his term as president of the American Psychological Association. In the first sentence of his book Authentic Happiness, Seligman claimed: "for the last half century psychology has been consumed with a single topic only – mental illness," expanding on Maslow's comments. He urged psychologists to continue the earlier missions of psychology of nurturing talent and improving normal life.

Development
The first positive psychology summit took place in 1999. The First International Conference on Positive Psychology took place in 2002. More attention was given by the general public in 2006 when, using the same framework, a course at Harvard University became particularly popular. In June 2009, the First World Congress on Positive Psychology took place at the University of Pennsylvania.

The field of positive psychology today is most advanced in the United States and Western Europe. Even though positive psychology offers a new approach to the study of positive emotions and behavior, the ideas, theories, research, and motivation to study the positive side of human behavior is as old as humanity.

Influences

Several humanistic psychologists, most notably Abraham Maslow, Carl Rogers, and Erich Fromm, developed theories and practices pertaining to human happiness and flourishing. More recently, positive psychologists have found empirical support for the humanistic theories of flourishing. In addition, positive psychology has moved ahead in a variety of new directions.

In 1984, Diener published his tripartite model of subjective well-being, positing "three distinct but often related components of wellbeing: frequent positive affect, infrequent negative affect, and cognitive evaluations such as life satisfaction." In this model, cognitive, affective and contextual factors contribute to subjective well-being. According to Diener and Suh, subjective well-being is "based on the idea that how each person thinks and feels about his or her life is important."

Carol Ryff's Six-factor Model of Psychological Well-being was initially published in 1989, and additional testing of its factors was published in 1995. It postulates six factors which are key for well-being, namely self-acceptance, personal growth, purpose in life, environmental mastery, autonomy, and positive relations with others.

According to Corey Keyes, who collaborated with Carol Ryff and uses the term flourishing as a central concept, mental well-being has three components, namely hedonic (c.q. subjective or emotional), psychological, and social well-being. Hedonic well-being concerns emotional aspects of well-being, whereas psychological and social well-being, c.q. eudaimonic well-being, concerns skills, abilities, and optimal functioning. This tripartite model of mental well-being has received extensive empirical support across cultures.

Influences in Ancient History 
While the formal title "positive psychology" has only been in common use since around 2000, the concepts that form the basis of this field have been present in religious and philosophical discourse for thousands of years. The field of psychology predating the use of the term positive psychology has seen researchers who focused primarily on topics that would now be included under the umbrella of positive psychology. Some view positive psychology as a meeting of Eastern thought, such as Buddhism, and Western psychodynamic approaches. The historical roots of positive psychology are found in the teachings of Aristotle, whose Nicomachean Ethics teach the cultivation of moral virtue as the means of attaining happiness and well-being, which he referred to as eudaimonia.

Core theory and methods

There is no accepted "gold standard" theory in positive psychology. However, the work of Seligman is regularly quoted. So too the work of Csikszentmihalyi and older models of well-being, such as Carol Ryff's Six-factor Model of Psychological Well-being and Diener's tripartite model of subjective well-being.

Initial theory: three paths to happiness
In Authentic Happiness (2002) Seligman proposed three kinds of a happy life that can be investigated:
 Pleasant life: research into the Pleasant Life, or the "life of enjoyment," examines how people optimally experience, forecast, and savor the positive feelings and emotions that are part of normal and healthy living (e.g., relationships, hobbies, interests, entertainment, etc.). Despite the attention given, Martin Seligman says this most transient element of happiness may be the least important.
 Good Life: investigation of the beneficial effects of immersion, absorption, and flow felt by individuals when optimally engaged with their primary activities, is the study of the Good Life, or the "life of engagement." Flow is experienced when there is a positive match between a person's strength and their current task, i.e., when one feels confident of accomplishing a chosen or assigned task.
 Meaningful Life: inquiry into the Meaningful Life, or "life of affiliation," questions how individuals derive a positive sense of well-being, belonging, meaning, and purpose from being part of and contributing back to something larger and more permanent than themselves (e.g., nature, social groups, organizations, movements, traditions, belief systems).

PERMA
In Flourish (2011) Seligman argued that the last category of his proposed three kinds of a happy life, "meaningful life," can be considered as 3 different categories. The resulting summary for this theory is Seligman's PERMA acronym: Positive Emotions, Engagement, Relationships, Meaning and purpose, and Accomplishments. It is a mnemonic for the five elements of Martin Seligman's well-being theory:
 Positive emotions include a wide range of feelings, not just happiness and joy. Included are emotions like excitement, satisfaction, pride and awe, amongst others. These emotions are frequently seen as connected to positive outcomes, such as longer life and healthier social relationships.
 Engagement refers to involvement in activities that draws and builds upon one's interests. Mihaly Csikszentmihalyi explains true engagement as flow, a state of deep effortless involvement, feeling of intensity that leads to a sense of ecstasy and clarity. The task being done needs to call upon higher skill and be a bit difficult and challenging yet still possible. Engagement involves passion for and concentration on the task at hand and is assessed subjectively as to whether the person engaged was completely absorbed, losing self-consciousness.
 Relationships are essential in fueling positive emotions, whether they are work-related, familial, romantic, or platonic. As Christopher Peterson puts it simply, "other people matter." Humans receive, share, and spread positivity to others through relationships. They are important not only in bad times, but good times as well. In fact, relationships can be strengthened by reacting to one another positively. It is typical that most positive things take place in the presence of other people.
 Meaning is also known as purpose, and prompts the question of "why." Discovering and figuring out a clear "why" puts everything into context from work to relationships to other parts of life. Finding meaning is learning that there is something greater than one's self. Despite potential challenges, working with meaning drives people to continue striving for a desirable goal.
 Accomplishments are the pursuit of success and mastery. Unlike the other parts of PERMA, they are sometimes pursued even when accomplishments do not result in positive emotions, meaning, or relationships. That being noted, accomplishments can activate the other elements of PERMA, such as pride, under positive emotion. Accomplishments can be individual or community-based, fun- or work-based.

Each of the five PERMA elements was selected according to three criteria:
 It contributes to well-being.
 It is pursued for its own sake.
 It is defined and measured independently of the other elements.

Character Strengths and Virtues

The development of the Character Strengths and Virtues (CSV) handbook (2004) represented the first attempt by Seligman and Peterson to identify and classify positive psychological traits of human beings. Much like the Diagnostic and Statistical Manual of Mental Disorders (DSM) of general psychology, the CSV provided a theoretical framework to assist in understanding strengths and virtues and for developing practical applications for positive psychology. This manual identified 6 classes of virtues (i.e., "core virtues"), underlying 24 measurable character strengths.

The CSV suggested these 6 virtues have a historical basis in the vast majority of cultures; in addition, these virtues and strengths can lead to increased happiness when built upon. Notwithstanding numerous cautions and caveats, this suggestion of universality hints threefold: 1) The study of positive human qualities broadens the scope of psychological research to include mental wellness, 2) the leaders of the positive psychology movement are challenging moral relativism, suggesting people are "evolutionarily predisposed" toward certain virtues, and 3) virtue has a biological basis.

The organization of the 6 virtues and 24 strengths is as follows:
 Wisdom and knowledge: creativity, curiosity, open-mindedness, love of learning, perspective, innovation, prudence
 Courage: bravery, persistence, vitality, zest
 Humanity: love, kindness, social intelligence
 Justice: citizenship, fairness, leadership, integrity, excellence
 Temperance: forgiveness and mercy, humility, self control
 Transcendence: appreciation of beauty, gratitude, hope, humor, spirituality

Recent research challenged the need for 6 virtues. Instead, researchers suggested the 24 strengths are more accurately grouped into just 3 or 4 categories: Intellectual Strengths, Interpersonal Strengths, and Temperance Strengths, or alternatively, Interpersonal Strengths, Fortitude, Vitality, and Cautiousness. These strengths, and their classifications, have emerged independently elsewhere in literature on values. Paul Thagard described examples, which included Jeff Shrager's workshops to discover the habits of highly creative people. Some research indicates that well-being effects that appear to be due to spirituality are actually better described as due to virtue.

Flow

In the 1970s, Hungarian-American psychologist Csikszentmihalyi began studying flow, a state of absorption where one's abilities are well-matched to the demands at-hand. It is what he often calls and refers to as "optimal experience". Flow is characterized by intense concentration, loss of self-awareness, a feeling of being perfectly challenged (neither bored nor overwhelmed), and a sense that "time is flying." Flow is intrinsically rewarding; it can also assist in the achievement of goals (e.g., winning a game) or improving skills (e.g., becoming a better chess player). Anyone can experience flow and it can be felt in different domains, such as play, creativity, and work. Flow is achieved when the challenge of the situation meets one's personal abilities. A mismatch of challenge for someone of low skills results in a state of anxiety and feeling overwhelmed; insufficient challenge for someone highly skilled, results in boredom. A good example of this would be an adult reading a children's book. They would not feel challenged enough to be engaged or motivated in the reading. Csikszentmihalyi created an organized explanation of this using various combinations of challenge and skills to predict psychological states. These four states included following:

 Apathy: low challenge and low skill(s)
 Relaxation: low challenge and high skill(s)
 Anxiety: high challenge and low skill(s)
 Flow: high challenge and high skill(s)

So the adult reading the children's book, as mentioned above, would most likely be in the relaxation state. The adult has no need to fear or worry that the task will be more than they could possibly handle. Challenge is a well founded explanation for how one enters the flow state and employ intense concentration. However, it does not stop there. There may be other underlying factors contributing. For example, one must be intrinsically motivated to participate in the activity/challenge. If the individual is not interested in the task, then there is no possibility of being absorbed into the flow state.

Benefits 
Flow can be extremely beneficial when it comes to parenting children. When flow is enhanced between parents and their children, the parents are more capable of thriving in their role as a parent. A parenting style that is positively oriented will also result in children that experience lower levels of stress and overall improve the child's well-being.

It has also been shown to have several benefits in a school setting. These can be with improved learning meaning that when students are in a state of flow they are fully engaged in the leading to better retention of information. Another benefit is increased motivation, which we can see by students having a more enjoyable and rewarding experience. Reduced stress can also be a benefit of this state which helps with student's mental health and well-being. As well as increased resilience this helps students overcome challenges or setbacks by teaching students to have a growth mindset.

The desire for most teachers, parents (etc.) is that the students become more engaged and interested in the classroom. Many may jump to the conclusion that students struggle and therefore only need help understand. That is the obstacle the students face. However, the true obstacle in the way learning is that they are not engaged enough. The design of the education system did not and was not able to account for such needs. One school implemented a program called PASS. They acknowledged that students needed more challenge and individual advancement; they referred to this as sport culture. This PASS program integrated an elective class where students could immerse themselves into. Such activities included, self-paced learning, mastery-based learning, performance learning, and so on.

Flow is also beneficial in our general well-being. It is a positive and intrinsically motivating experience. It is known to "produce intense feelings of enjoyment". That is why it can improve our lives by making them happier and more meaningful. This can eventually lead to positive affect in the long run. This is because Csikszentmihalyi discovered that our personal growth and development generates happiness. That is why flow is positive experience because it promotes that opportunity for personal development.

Negatives

While Flow can be beneficial to students, there are some potential drawbacks to look at: narrow focus, when students are experiencing Flow, they can become overly focused on a particular task. This can lead to students neglecting other important aspects of their learning.

In positive psychology there can be several misunderstandings on what clinicians and individuals define as positive. In certain instances, it can be said that positive qualities, such as optimism, can be detrimental to health, and therefore appear as a negative quality. Alternatively, negative processes, such as anxiety, can be conducive to health and stability and thus would appear as a positive quality. Due to this short-coming from the initial wave of positive psychology, there has since been a second wave that has further identified and characterized "positive" and "negative" complexes through the use of critical and dialectical thinking. Researchers in 2016 chose to identify these characteristics via two complexes: post-traumatic growth and love as well as optimism vs pessimism.

Research advances and applications 

Topical and methodological development has expanded the field of positive psychology. These advances have enabled the field of positive psychology to grow beyond its core theories and methods. Positive psychology is now a global area of study, with various national indices tracking citizens' happiness ratings.

Research findings 
Research in positive psychology, well-being, eudaimonia and happiness, and the theories of Diener, Ryff, Keyes and Seligman cover a broad range of topics including "the biological, personal, relational, institutional, cultural, and global dimensions of life." A meta-analysis on 49 studies in 2009 showed that Positive Psychology Interventions (PPI) produced improvements in well-being and lower depression levels, the PPIs studied included writing gratitude letters, learning optimistic thinking, replaying positive life experiences and socializing with others. In a later meta-analysis of 39 studies with 6,139 participants in 2012, the outcomes were positive. Three to six months after a PPI the effects for subjective well-being and psychological well-being were still significant. However the positive effect was weaker than in the 2009 meta analysis, the authors concluded that this was because they only used higher quality studies. The PPIs they considered included counting blessings, kindness practices, making personal goals, showing gratitude and focusing on personal strengths. Another review of PPIs published in 2018 found that over 78% of intervention studies were conducted in Western countries.

In the textbook Positive Psychology: The Science of Happiness, authors Compton and Hoffman give the "Top Down Predictors" of well-being as high self esteem, optimism, self efficacy, a sense of meaning in life and positive relationships with others. The personality traits most associated with well being are extraversion, agreeability and low levels of neuroticism.

In a study published in 2020, students were enrolled in a positive psychology course that focused on improving happiness and well-being through teaching about positive psychology. The participants answer questions pertaining to the 5 categories known as PERMA. At the end of the semester those same students reported significantly higher scores in all categories (p <.001) minus engagement which was significant at p < .05. One of the aims of this study was to make it rewarding for positive psychology interventions to stay in the participants lives. The authors stated, “Not only do students learn and get credit, there is also a good chance that many will reap the benefits in what is most important to them—their health, happiness, and well-being.”

Academic methods

Quantitative 
Quantitative methods in positive psychology include p-technique factor analysis, dynamic factor analysis, interindividual differences and structural equation modeling, spectral analysis and item response models, dynamic systems analysis, latent growth analysis, latent-class models, hierarchical linear modeling, measurement invariance, experimental methods, behavior genetics, and integration of quantitative and qualitative approaches.

Qualitative 
In a 2012 Journal of Positive Psychology article published by Grant J. Rich, the usage of qualitative methodology to study positive psychology is explored and considered. Author Rich addresses the popularity of quantitative methods in studying the empirical questions that positive psychology presents. He argues that there is an "overemphasis" on quantitative methods and suggests implementing qualitative methods, such as semi-structured interviews, observations, fieldwork, creative artwork, and focus groups. Rich states that qualitative approaches are valuable approaches to studying positive psychology. He writes that usage of qualitative methods will further promote the "flourishing of positive psychology" and encourages such practice.

Behavioral interventions 
Changing happiness levels through interventions is a further methodological advancement in the study of positive psychology. Enhancing happiness through behavioral interventions has been the focus of various academic and scientific psychological publications. Happiness-enhancing interventions include expressing kindness, gratitude, optimism, humility, awe, and mindfulness.

In 2005, Sonja Lyubomirsky, Kennon M. Sheldon, and David Schkade co-authored an academic paper published in the Review of General Psychology. In their research, they created a behavioral experiment using two 6-week interventions. One intervention studied was the performance of acts of kindness. The other was focused on gratitude and emphasized the counting of one's blessings. The study participants who went through the behavioral interventions reported higher levels of happiness and well-being than those who did not participate in either intervention. The paper provides experimental support for the effect of gratitude and kindness on enhancing subjective well-being and happiness.

Further research conducted by Sonja Lyubomirsky, Rene Dickerhoof, Julia K. Boehm, and Kennon M. Sheldon, published in 2011 in the academic journal Emotion, found that the interventions of expressing optimism and expressing gratitude enhanced subjective well-being in participants who took part in the intervention for 8 months. The researchers concluded that interventions are "most successful when participants know about, endorse, and commit to the intervention." The article provides support that when individuals enthusiastically take part in behavioral interventions, such as expression of optimism and gratitude, they may be engaging in an approach to increase happiness and subjective well-being.

In 2014, Elliott Kruse, Joseph Chancellor, Peter M. Ruberton, and Sonja Lyubomirsky published an academic article in the journal Social Psychology and Personality Science. In their research, they study the interaction effects between gratitude and humility through behavior interventions. The interventions they studied were writing a gratitude letter and writing a 14-day diary. In both interventions, Kruse et al. found that gratitude and humility are connected and are "mutually reinforcing." The article also discusses how gratitude, and its associated humility, may lead to more positive emotional states and subjective well-being.

Researchers Melanie Rudd, Kathleen D. Vohs, and Jennifer Aaker conducted a series of experiments that showed a positive effect of awe on subjective well-being, publishing their results in 2012 in the academic journal Psychological Science. Their research found that individuals who felt awe also reported feeling higher availability of time, more preference for experiential expenditures than material expenditures, and greater life satisfaction. Experiences that heighten awe may lead to higher levels of life satisfaction and, in turn, higher levels of happiness and subjective well-being.

Mindfulness interventions may also increase happiness. In a Mindfulness article published in 2011 by Torbjörn Josefsson, Pernilla Larsman, Anders G. Broberg, and Lars-Gunnar Lundh, it was found that meditation improves subjective well-being for individuals who mindfully meditate. The researchers note that being mindful in meditation includes awareness and observation of one's meditation practice, with non-reaction and non-judgmental sentiments during meditation.

National indices of happiness 
The creation of various national indices of happiness have broadened and expanded the field of positive psychology to a global scale.

In a January 2000 academic article published in American Psychologist, psychologist Ed Diener proposed and argued for the creation of a national happiness index in the United States. Such an index would provide measurements of happiness, or subjective well-being, within the United States and across many other countries in the world. Diener argued that national indices would be helpful markers or indicators of population happiness, providing a sense of current ratings and a tracker of happiness across time. Diener proposed that the national index include various sub-measurements of subjective well-being, including "pleasant affect, unpleasant affect, life satisfaction, fulfillment, and more specific states such as stress, affection, trust, and joy."

In 2012, the first World Happiness Report was published. The World Happiness Report was initiated by the UN General Assembly in June 2011, which passed the Bhutanese Resolution. The Bhutanese Resolution called for nations across the world to "give more importance to happiness and well-being in determining how to achieve and measure social and economic development." The data for the World Happiness Reports is collected in partnership with the Gallup World Poll's life evaluations and annual happiness rankings. The World Happiness Report bases its national rankings on how happy constituents self-report and believe themselves to be.

The first World Happiness Report, published in 2012, is a 170-page report that details the state of world happiness, the causes of happiness and misery, policy implications from happiness reports, and three case studies of subjective well-being for 1) Bhutan and its Gross National Happiness index, 2) the U.K. Office for National Statistics Experience, and 3) happiness in the member countries within the OECD. The World Happiness Report published in 2020 is the eighth publication in the series of reports. It is the first World Happiness Report to include happiness rankings of cities across the world, in addition to rankings of 156 countries. The city of Helsinki, Finland was reported as the city with the highest subjective well-being ranking, and the country of Finland was reported as the country with the highest subjective well-being ranking for the third year in a row. The 2020 report provides insights on happiness based on environmental conditions, social conditions, urban-rural happiness differentials, and sustainable development. It also provides overview and possible explanations for why Nordic countries have consistently ranked in the top ten happiest countries in the World Happiness Report since 2013. Possible explanations include Nordic countries' high-quality government benefits and protections to its citizens, including welfare benefits and well-operated democratic institutions, as well as social connections, bonding, and trust.

Additional national well-being indices and reported statistics include the Gallup Global Emotions Report, Gallup Sharecare Well-Being Index, Global Happiness Council's Global Happiness and Well-being Policy Report, Happy Planet Index, Indigo Wellness Index, OECD Better Life Index, and UN Human Development Reports.

Influences on other academic fields 
Positive psychology has influenced a variety of other academic fields of study and scholarship. It has been applied to various other areas of scholarship, most notably organizational behavior, education and psychiatry.

Positive Organizational Scholarship (POS) 
Positive Organizational Scholarship (POS), also referred to as Positive Organizational Behavior (POB), began as a direct application of positive psychology to the field of organizational behavior. One of the first times the term was officially defined and published was in 2003, in the text Positive Organizational Scholarship: Foundations of a New Discipline edited by University of Michigan Ross School of Business professors Kim S. Cameron, Jane E. Dutton, and Robert E. Quinn. In the first chapter of the text, Cameron, Dutton, and Quinn promote "the best of the human condition," such as goodness, compassion, resilience, and positive human potential, as an organizational goal as important as financial organizational success. The goal of POS is to study the factors that create positive work experiences and successful, people-oriented organizational outcomes.

A large collection of POS research is contained in the 2011 volume The Oxford Handbook of Positive Organizational Scholarship, edited by University of Michigan Ross School of Business Professors Kim S. Cameron and Gretchen M. Spreitzer. This 1076-page volume encompasses nine sections and 79 chapters spanning various topics. Major topics include positive human resource practices, positive organizational practices, and positive leadership and change. Much of the volume expands upon and applies core concepts of positive psychology to the workplace context, covering areas such as positive individual attributes, positive emotions, strengths and virtues, and positive relationships. A further definition of POS, as written by editors Cameron and Spreitzer:Positive organizational scholarship rigorously seeks to understand what represents the best of the human condition based on scholarly research and theory. Just as positive psychology focuses on exploring optimal individual psychological states rather than pathological ones, organizational scholarship focuses attention on the generative dynamics in organizations that lead to the development of human strength, foster resiliency in employees, enable healing and restoration, and cultivate extraordinary individual and organizational performance. POS emphasizes what elevates individuals and organizations (in addition to what challenges them), what goes right in organizations (in addition to what goes wrong), what is life-giving (in addition to what is problematic or life-depleting), what is experienced as good (in addition to what is objectionable), and what is inspiring (in addition to what is difficult or arduous).

Psychiatry 
Positive psychology has influenced psychiatry by providing additional therapeutic and cognitive behavior shifts, including well-being therapy, positive psychotherapy, and practicing an integration of positive psychology in therapeutic practice.

In an 2015 academic article published in Journal of Occupational Rehabilitation, Mills and Kreutzer argue for the principles of positive psychology to be implemented to assist those recovering from traumatic brain injury (TBI). They make the case that TBI rehabilitation practices rely on the betterment of the individual through engaging in everyday practices, a practice significantly related to tenets of positive psychology. Their proposal to connect positive psychology with TBI vocational rehabilitation (VR) also looks at happiness and its correlation with improvements in mental health, including increased confidence and productivity, as well as others. While the authors point out that empirical evidence for positive psychology is limited, they clarify that positive psychology's focus on small successes, optimism and prosocial behavior is promising for improvements in the social and emotional well-being of TBI patients.

Popular culture
The study of positive psychology has been translated into various popular media outlets, including books and films, and has been an influencing factor in the wellness industry.

Books 
There have been several popular psychology books written by positive psychologists for a general audience.

Ilona Boniwell, in her book Positive Psychology in a Nutshell, provided a summary of the current research. According to Boniwell, well-being is related to optimism, extraversion, social connections (i.e., close friendships), being married, having engaging work, religion or spirituality, leisure, good sleep and exercise, social class (through lifestyle differences and better coping methods) and subjective health (what you think about your health). Boniwell further writes that well-being is not related to age, physical attractiveness, money (once basic needs are met), gender (women are more often depressed but also more often joyful), educational level, having children (although they add meaning to life), moving to a sunnier climate, crime prevention, housing and objective health (what doctors say).

Sonja Lyubomirsky, in her book The How of Happiness, provides advice and guidance on how to improve happiness. According to The How of Happiness, individuals should create new habits, seek out new emotions, use variety and timing to prevent hedonic adaptation, and enlist others to motivate and support during the creation of those new habits. Lyubomirsky gives 12 happiness activities, including savoring life, learning to forgive, and living in the present.

Stumbling on Happiness by Daniel Gilbert is another popular book that shares positive psychology research findings for a general readership audience. Gilbert presents research suggesting that individuals are often poor at predicting what will make them happy in the future and that individuals are prone to misevaluating the causes of their happiness. He also notes that the subjectivity of subjective well-being and happiness often is the most difficult challenge to overcome in predicting future happiness, noting that our future selves may have different subjective perspectives on life than our current selves.

Films 
Coverage of positive psychology has entered the film industry. Similarly, films have provided the basis of new research within positive psychology.

Happy (2011 film) is a full-length documentary film covering overviewing the fields of positive psychology and neuroscience. It also highlights various case studies on happiness across diverse cultures and geographies. The film features interviews with notable positive psychologists and scholars, including Daniel Gilbert, Ed Diener, Sonja Lyubomirsky, and Mihaly Csikszentmihalyi.

The Positive Psychology News website includes a section on annual Positive Psychology Movie Awards. The Positive Psychology Movie Awards ranks a short list of feature films of 2009, 2014, and annually between 2016 and 2018 that feature powerful messages of positive psychology. The rankings are according to the website's author, Ryan Niemiec, Psy.D, who is a psychologist, coach, and education director of the VIA Institute on Character. The Positive Psychology Movie Awards presents separate awards for categories including: Best Positive Psychology Film, Award for Positive Relationships, Award for Meaning, Award for Achievement, Award for Mindfulness, Award for Happiness, Signature Strengths Use, among others.

Further research done on positive psychology as represented in feature films has been done in association with the VIA Institute. Contemporary and popular films that promote or represent character strengths are the basis for various academic articles.

Wellness industry 
The growing popularity and attention given to positive psychology research has influenced industry growth, development, and consumption of products and services meant to cater to wellness and well-being.

According to the Global Wellness Institute, as of 2018, the global wellness economy is valued at $4.5 trillion and the wellness industry represents 5.3% of global economic output. Key sectors of the wellness industry include workplace wellness, fitness and mind-body, personal care, and wellness lifestyle.

Highlighting happiness and well-being has been a strategy harnessed by various companies in their marketing strategies. Food and beverage companies such as Coca-Cola and Pocky, whose motto is "Share happiness!", emphasize happiness in their commercials, branding, and descriptions. CEOs at retail companies such as Zappos have profited by publishing books detailing their deliverance of happiness, while Amazon's logo features a dimpled smile.

Criticism
Positive psychology has been criticized in many different aspects from its conception continuing into the present day.

Reality distortion 
In 1988, psychologists Shelley E. Taylor and Jonathan D. Brown co-authored a Psychological Bulletin article that coined the phrase positive illusions. Positive illusions are the cognitive processes individuals engage in when self-aggrandizing or self-enhancing. They are the unrealistically positive or self-affirming attitudes that individuals hold of themselves, their position, or their environment. In essence, positive illusions are attitudes of extreme optimism that endure even in the face of facts and real conditions. Taylor and Brown suggested that positive illusions protect individuals from negative feedback that they might receive, and this, in turn, preserves their psychological adaptation and subjective well-being. However, later research has found that engaging in positive illusions and related attitudes has led to psychological maladaptive conditions. These conditions include poorer social relationships, expressions of narcissism, and negative workplace outcomes, thus reducing the positive effects that positive illusions have on subjective well-being, overall happiness, and life satisfaction.

Kirk Schneider, editor of the Journal of Humanistic Psychology, has said that positive psychology fails to explain past heinous behaviors such as those perpetrated by the Nazi party, Stalinist marches and Klan gatherings, to identify but a few. He also pointed to a body of research showing high positivity correlates with positive illusion, which effectively distorts reality. The extent of the downfall of high positivity or flourishing is one could become incapable of psychological growth, unable to self-reflect, and tend to hold racial biases. By contrast, negativity, sometimes evidenced in mild to moderate depression, is correlated with less distortion of reality. Therefore, Schneider argues, negativity might play an important role within the dynamics of human flourishing. To illustrate, conflict engagement and acknowledgement of appropriate negativity, including certain negative emotions like guilt, might better promote flourishing. Overall, Schneider provided perspective: "perhaps genuine happiness is not something you aim at, but is...a by-product of a life well lived – and a life well lived does not settle on the programmed or neatly calibrated."

Narrow focus 
In 2003, Ian Sample, writing for The Guardian, noted that, "Positive psychologists also stand accused of burying their heads in the sand and ignoring that depressed, even merely unhappy people, have real problems that need dealing with." He also quoted Steven Wolin, a clinical psychiatrist at George Washington University, as saying that the study of positive psychology is just a reiteration of older ways of thinking, and that there is not much scientific research to support the efficacy of this method. Gable responds to criticism on their Pollyanna view on the world by saying that they are just bringing a balance to a side of psychology that is glaringly understudied. To defend his point, Gable points to the imbalances favoring research into negative psychological well-being in cognitive psychology, health psychology, and social psychology.

Martin Jack has also maintained that positive psychology is not unique in its optimistic approach to looking at optimal emotional well-being, stating that other forms of psychology, such as counseling and educational psychology, are also interested in positive human fulfillment. He goes on to mention that, while positive psychology has pushed for schools to be more student-centered and able to foster positive self-images in children, he worries that a lack of focus on self-control may prevent children from making full contributions to society. If positive psychology is not implemented correctly, it can cause more harm than good. This is the case, for example, when interventions in school are coercive (in the sense of being imposed on everyone without regard for the individual child's reason for negativity) and fail to take each student's context into account.

Role of negativity 
Barbara S. Held, a professor at Bowdoin College, argued that while positive psychology makes contributions to the field of psychology, it has its faults. She offered insight into topics including the negative side effects of positive psychology, negativity within the positive psychology movement, and the current division in the field of psychology caused by differing opinions of psychologists on positive psychology. In addition, she noted the movement's lack of consistency regarding the role of negativity. She also raised issues with the simplistic approach taken by some psychologists in the application of positive psychology. A "one size fits all" approach is arguably not beneficial to the advancement of the field of positive psychology; she suggested a need for individual differences to be incorporated into its application. By teaching young people that being confident and optimistic leads to success, when they are unsuccessful they will begin to believe it is because they are insecure or pessimistic. This could lead them to believe that any negative internal thought or feeling they may experience is damaging to their happiness and should be steered clear of completely.

Toxic positivity 

A recent critical response to the field of positive psychology is that around toxic positivity. Toxic positivity is the phenomenon in which individuals do not fully acknowledge, process, or manage the entire spectrum of human emotion, including anger and sadness. This genre of criticism against positive psychology argues that the field of positive psychology places too much importance on "upbeat thinking, while shunting challenging and difficult experiences to the side." Individuals who engage in a constant chase for positive experiences or states of high subjective well-being may be inadvertently stigmatizing negative emotional conditions, such as depression, or may be suppressing natural emotional responses, such as sadness, regret, or stress. Furthermore, by not allowing negative emotional states to be experienced, or by suppressing and hiding negative emotional responses, individuals may experience harmful physical, cardiovascular and respiratory consequences. Proponents of combating toxic positivity advocate allowing oneself to accept and fully experience negative emotional states.

Methodological and philosophical critiques 

Richard Lazarus, who was well known in psychology for his Cognitive-Motivational-Relational theory of emotions, has thoroughly critiqued positive psychology's methodological and philosophical components. He holds that giving more detail and insight into the positive is not bad, but not at the expense of the negative aspect because the two (positive and negative) are inseparable. The first methodological issue noted is positive psychology's use of correlational and cross-sectional research designs to indicate causality between the movement's ideas and healthy lives; there could be other factors not researched and time differences that account for healthier lives that the researchers do not account for. Secondly, he considers that emotions cannot be categorized dichotomously into positive and negative; by nature, emotions are subjective and rich in social/relational meaning. Additionally, he claims that emotions are fluid, meaning that the context they appear in changes over time. He states that "all emotions have the potential of being either one or the other, or both, on different occasions, and even on the same occasion when an emotion is experienced by different persons" The third issue is the neglect of individual differences in most social science research. Many research designs focus on the statistical significance of the groups while overlooking differences among individuals. Lazarus's final methodological complaint is social science researchers' tendency to not adequately define and measure emotions. Most assessments are quick checklists and do not provide adequate debriefing. Many researchers do not differentiate between fluid emotional states and relatively stable personality traits.

Lazarus further holds that positive psychology claims to be new and innovative although the majority of research on stress and coping theory make much of the same claims as positive psychology. The movement attempts to uplift and reinforce the positive aspects of one's life, but everyone in life experiences stress and hardship. Coping through these events should not be looked at as adapting to failures, but should be regarded as successfully navigating stress, but the movement doesn't hold that perspective.

Another critique concerning Positive Psychology is that it is considered to have been developed from a Eurocentric worldview. The concern of intersectionality has become a methodological concern regarding studies within Positive Psychology.

The US Army's Comprehensive Soldier Fitness program 

The Comprehensive Soldier Fitness (CSF) program was established in 2008 by then-Chief of Staff of the United States Army, General George W. Casey, Jr., in an effort to address the increasing rates of drug abuse, family violence, PTSD, and suicide among soldiers. The Army contracted with Martin Seligman's Positive Psychology Center at the University of Pennsylvania to supply a program closely based on the center's Penn Resiliency Program, which was designed for 10- to 14-year-old children. Although Seligman proposed starting with a small-scale pilot-test, General Casey insisted on immediately rolling out the CSF to the entire Army. Interviewed for the journal Monitor on Psychology of the American Psychological Association, Seligman said that "This is the largest study—1.1 million soldiers—psychology has ever been involved in." According to journalist Jesse Singal, "It would become one of the largest mental-health interventions geared at a single population in the history of humanity, and possibly the most expensive."

Some psychologists have criticized the CSF for various reasons. Nicholas J. L. Brown wrote that "The idea that techniques that have demonstrated, at best, marginal effects in reducing depressive symptoms in school-age children could also prevent the onset of a condition that is associated with some of the most extreme situations with which humans can be confronted is a remarkable one that does not seem to be backed up by empirical evidence."
Stephen Soldz of the Boston Graduate School of Psychoanalysis cited Seligman's acknowledgment that the CSF is a gigantic study rather than a program based on proven techniques, and questioned the ethics of requiring soldiers to participate in research without informed consent. Soldz also criticized the CSF training for trying to build up-beat attitudes toward combat: "Might soldiers who have been trained to resiliently view combat as a growth opportunity be more likely to ignore or under-estimate real dangers, thereby placing themselves, their comrades, or civilians at heightened risk of harm?"

In 2021 the Chronicle of Higher Education carried a debate between Singal and Seligman about whether, with the CSF well into its second decade, there was any solid evidence of its effectiveness. Singal cited studies that, he said, failed to find any measurable benefits in such positive psychology techniques, and he criticized the Army's own reports as methodologically unsound and lacking peer review. Seligman said that Singal had misinterpreted the studies and ignored the Army's positive feedback from soldiers, one of whom told Seligman that "if I had had this training years ago, it would have saved my marriage."

See also

Precursors
 
 
 Needs and Motives (Henry Murray)
 

Various

Notes

References

Bibliography

Further reading

External links

Origins
 Christopher Peterson, What Is Positive Psychology, and What Is It Not?
 The 5 Founding Fathers and A History of Positive Psychology
 The Father of Positive Psychology and His Two Theories of Happiness
Resources
 University of Pennsylvania, Authentic Happiness, website of Martin Seligman
Various
 Martin Seligman presentation on positive psychology (Video) at TED conference
 The Karma of Happiness: A Buddhist Monk Looks at Positive Psychology by Thanissaro Bhikkhu

 
Happiness
Psychological schools
Positive criminology
Well-being